Signature Entertainment is a film distribution and film production company founded in 2011 in the UK.

Overview 
Signature Entertainment was founded in 2011 by Marc Goldberg. The company released over 1,000 films since its inception and became an independent label in the UK. The company's releases include Rami Malek prison escape drama Papillon and Sam Neill comedy Rams, number 1 UK box-office hit Honest Thief and A Rainy Day in New York starring Timothée Chalamet. Their upcoming films includes Brian Epstein biopic Midas Man, Liam Neeson thriller The Ice Road, and festival lauded thriller Bull.

After executive producing 12 films, in 2018 Goldberg set up Signature Films, the film production arm of the company. Signature Films has produced or co-produced several movies such as Into the Deep, She is Love, The Courier in 2019 (starring Gary Oldman and Olga Kurylenko), The Hatton Garden Job (starring Larry Lamb, Matthew Goode and Stephen Moyer), Confession with Stephen Moyer and Colm Meaney and Final Score (starring Dave Bautista and Pierce Brosnan).

In April 2018 FFI, the holding company of Film Finances Inc. acquired Signature Entertainment which was later re-acquired by its original stakeholders in 2021.

Film awards 

 Screen Award 2015 - Predestination
 Screen Award 2015 - Rising Star
 BASE Award 2016 - Predestination
 BASE Award 2018 - The Hatton Garden Job

References 

Film distributors of the United Kingdom
Film production companies of the United Kingdom